Eulamprotes is a genus of moths in the family Gelechiidae.

Species
Eulamprotes altaicella Huemer & Karsholt, 2013
Eulamprotes atrella (Denis & Schiffermuller, 1775)
Eulamprotes atrifrontella Huemer & Karsholt, 2013
Eulamprotes baldizzonei Huemer & Karsholt, 2013
Eulamprotes gemerensis Elsner, 2013
Eulamprotes graecatella Sumpich & Skyva, 2012
Eulamprotes helotella (Staudinger, 1859)
Eulamprotes immaculatella (Douglas, 1850)
Eulamprotes isostacta (Meyrick, 1926)
Eulamprotes kailai Huemer & Karsholt, 2013
Eulamprotes libertinella (Zeller, 1872)
Eulamprotes mirusella Huemer & Karsholt, 2013
Eulamprotes nigritella (Zeller, 1847)
Eulamprotes nigromaculella (Milliere, 1872)
Eulamprotes occidentella Huemer & Karsholt, 2011
Eulamprotes ochricapilla (Rebel, 1903)
Eulamprotes parahelotella Nel, 1995
Eulamprotes plumbella (Heinemann, 1870)
Eulamprotes superbella (Zeller, 1839)
Eulamprotes unicolorella (Duponchel, 1843)
Eulamprotes wieseri Huemer & Karsholt, 2013
Eulamprotes wilkella (Linnaeus, 1758)

Former species
Eulamprotes buvati Leraut, 1991

References

 
Isophrictini